In fluid dynamics, a trochoidal wave or Gerstner wave is an exact solution of the Euler equations for periodic surface gravity waves. It describes a progressive wave of permanent form on the surface of an incompressible fluid of infinite depth. The free surface of this wave solution is an inverted (upside-down) trochoid – with sharper crests and flat troughs. This wave solution was discovered by Gerstner in 1802, and rediscovered independently by Rankine in 1863.

The flow field associated with the trochoidal wave is not irrotational: it has vorticity. The vorticity is of such a specific strength and vertical distribution that the trajectories of the fluid parcels are closed circles. This is in contrast with the usual experimental observation of Stokes drift associated with the wave motion. Also the phase speed is independent of the trochoidal wave's amplitude, unlike other nonlinear wave-theories (like those of the Stokes wave and cnoidal wave) and observations. For these reasons – as well as for the fact that solutions for finite fluid depth are lacking – trochoidal waves are of limited use for engineering applications.

In computer graphics, the rendering of realistic-looking ocean waves can be done by use of so-called Gerstner waves. This is a multi-component and multi-directional extension of the traditional Gerstner wave, often using fast Fourier transforms to make (real-time) animation feasible.

Description of classical trochoidal wave

Using a Lagrangian specification of the flow field, the motion of fluid parcels is – for a periodic wave on the surface of a fluid layer of infinite depth:

The Lagrangian coordinates  label the fluid parcels, with  the centres of the circular orbits – around which the corresponding fluid parcel moves with constant speed  Further  is the wavenumber (and  the wavelength), while  is the phase speed with which the wave propagates in the -direction. The phase speed satisfies the dispersion relation:

which is independent of the wave nonlinearity (i.e. does not depend on the wave height ), and this phase speed  the same as for Airy's linear waves in deep water.

The free surface is a line of constant pressure, and is found to correspond with a line , where  is a (nonpositive) constant. For  the highest waves occur, with a cusp-shaped crest. Note that the highest (irrotational) Stokes wave has a crest angle of 120°, instead of the 0° for the rotational trochoidal wave.

The wave height of the trochoidal wave is  The wave is periodic in the -direction, with wavelength  and also periodic in time with period 

The vorticity  under the trochoidal wave is:

varying with Lagrangian elevation  and diminishing rapidly with depth below the free surface.

In computer graphics

A multi-component and multi-directional extension of the Lagrangian description of the free-surface motion – as used in Gerstner's trochoidal wave – is used in computer graphics for the simulation of ocean waves. For the classical Gerstner wave the fluid motion exactly satisfies the nonlinear, incompressible and inviscid flow equations below the free surface. However, the extended Gerstner waves do in general not satisfy these flow equations exactly (although they satisfy them approximately, i.e. for the linearised Lagrangian description by potential flow). This description of the ocean can be programmed very efficiently by use of the fast Fourier transform (FFT). Moreover, the resulting ocean waves from this process look realistic, as a result of the nonlinear deformation of the free surface (due to the Lagrangian specification of the motion): sharper crests and flatter troughs.

where  is the hyperbolic tangent function,  is the number of wave components considered,  is the amplitude of component  and  its phase. Further  is its wavenumber and  its angular frequency. The latter two,  and  can not be chosen independently but are related through the dispersion relation:

with  the mean water depth.

A clever choice is needed in order to exploit the possibility of fast computation by means of the FFT. See e.g.  for a description how to do this. Most often, the wavenumbers are chosen on a regular grid in -space. Thereafter, the amplitudes  and phases  are chosen randomly in accord with the variance-density spectrum of a certain desired sea state. Finally, by FFT, the  ocean surface can be constructed in such a way that it is periodic both in space and time, enabling tiling – creating periodicity in time by slightly shifting the frequencies  such that  for 

In rendering, also the normal vector  to the surface is often needed. These can be computed using the cross product as:

Notes

References

. Reprinted in: Annalen der Physik 32(8), pp. 412–445, 1809.

 Originally published in 1879, the 6th extended edition appeared first in 1932.

Water waves
Wave mechanics
Physical oceanography
3D computer graphics
Articles containing video clips
Oceanographical terminology